Simeon Shterev may refer to
Simeon Shterev, Jr. (born 1985), Bulgarian football player
Simeon Shterev, Sr. (born 1959), Bulgarian wrestler